Rhineura floridana, known commonly as the  Florida worm lizard, graveyard snake, or thunderworm, is a species of amphisbaeninan in the family Rhineuridae. The species is the only extant member of the genus Rhineura, and is found primarily in Florida but has been recorded in Lanier County, Georgia. There are no subspecies that are recognized as being valid.

Description
The head has a shovel-like snout that projects forward past the lower jaws, which is used for burrowing. The eyes are highly reduced and not visible externally. The limbs are absent and, as in other Amphisbaenia, the body is covered by scales arranged in rings giving the animal a worm-like appearance.

Habitat
The preferred natural habitats of R. floridana are forest and shrubland.

Behavior
R. floridana is a burrower, preferring a soil, sand, or leaf mold substrate, and spending most of its time underground where it is safe from predators. It surfaces only when heavy rain or plowing forces it to evacuate its burrow. Because of the former, it is sometimes called thunderworm. When disturbed, it retreats into its burrow tail-first.

Diet
The diet of R. floridana includes insects and earthworms, but it is an opportunistic feeder and will eat almost any invertebrate small enough to catch.

Reproduction
Reproduction in R. floridana is by laying eggs (oviparity).

Conservation status
Rhineura floridana is classified as Least Concern on the IUCN Red List of Threatened Species. Species are listed as such due to their wide distribution, presumed large population, or because it is unlikely to be declining fast enough to qualify for listing in a more threatened category. The population trend is stable.

References

Further reading
Baird SF (1858). "Description of New Genera and Species of North American Lizards in the Museum of the Smithsonian Institution". Proceedings of the Academy of Natural Sciences of Philadelphia 10: 253–256. (Lepidosternon floridanum, new species, p. 255).
Conant R (1975). A Field Guide to Reptiles and Amphibians of Eastern and Central North America, Second Edition. (illustrated by Isabelle Hunt Conant). Boston: Houghton Mifflin Company. xviii + 429 pp. + Plates 1-48.  (hardcover),  (paperback). (Rhineura floridana, p. 135 + Plate 13 + map 98).
Powell R, Conant R, Collins JT (2016). Peterson Field Guide to Reptiles and Amphibians of Eastern and Central North America, Fourth Edition. Boston and New York: Houghton Mifflin Harcourt. xiv + 494 pp., 47 Plates, 207 Figures. . (Rhineura floridana p. 323, Figure 156 + Plate 30).
Smith HM, Brodie ED Jr (1982). Reptiles of North America: A Guide to Field Identification. New York: Golden Press. 240 pp.  (paperback),  (hardcover). (Rhineura floridana, pp. 132–133).
Stejneger L, Barbour T (1917). A Check List of North American Amphibians and Reptiles. Cambridge, Massachusetts: Harvard University Press. 125 pp. (Rhineura floridana, p. 72).

Zim HS, Smith HM (1956). Reptiles and Amphibians: A Guide to Familiar American Species: A Golden Nature Guide. (illustrated by James Gordon Irving). New York: Simon and Schuster. 160 pp. (Rhineura floridana, pp. 68, 155).

Amphisbaenians
Reptiles of the United States
Endemic fauna of the Southeastern United States
Taxa named by Spencer Fullerton Baird
Reptiles described in 1858